Gaspare Testone (8 May 1704 – 1801) was an Italian painter and architect, active in Sicily. He painted sacred subjects, primarily in the Baroque style.

Biography
Testone was born to the daughter of the painter Michele Blasco in Sciacca. He began learning under Francesco Aversa, a pupil of Blasco. He then moved to train in Palermo. He painted a Death of St Joseph and a St Benedict destroy the Idols and chases the Demons from Monte Cassino for Santa Maria dell'Itria. he also painted still lifes, genre scenes, and portraits. He also painted a Holy Family, a St Scolastica, and the Martyrdom of St Eufemia. He painted a San Biagio, a Presentation of the Virgin at the Temple, an Annunciation, and a Massacre of the Innocents. For the church of Santa Margherita, he painted an Adoration of the Magi and a Nativity (design by Sebastiano Conca). Also in Sciacca, he painted a St. Cataldo  and painted for the Santuario di San Calogero a canvas depicting St Zosimo Administers the Eucharist to St Maria Egiziaca.

References

1704 births
1801 deaths
People from Sciacca
18th-century Italian painters
Italian male painters
Painters from Sicily
Italian Baroque painters
Architects from Sicily
18th-century Italian male artists